is a Japanese politician of the Liberal Democratic Party (LDP), a member of the House of Representatives in the Diet (national legislature). A native of Fukuyama, Hiroshima and graduate of the University of Tokyo, he joined the Ministry of Finance in 1974, receiving a MPA from Harvard University in the United States while in the ministry. Leaving the ministry in 1993, he was elected to the House of Representatives for the first time in 2000.

Family
Yoichi Miyazawa is the son of former justice minister Hiroshi Miyazawa, nephew of former prime minister Kiichi Miyazawa, and cousin of current prime minister Fumio Kishida.

References

External links 
 Official website in Japanese.

1950 births
Living people
People from Fukuyama, Hiroshima
University of Tokyo alumni
Harvard Kennedy School alumni
Members of the House of Representatives (Japan)
Liberal Democratic Party (Japan) politicians
21st-century Japanese politicians
Yoichi
Government ministers of Japan